Nonnie Griffin (20 October 1933 – 7 June 2019) was a Canadian film, stage, television and voice actress. She studied at the Toronto Conservatory in her native land, the Royal Academy of Dramatic Arts in London, and even with famed mime artist Marcel Marceau. Her stage work includes playing Mrs. Rafi in the original Toronto production of The Sea and a 10-month run as the title character in Hello, Dolly! at the Limelight Dinner Theatre in Toronto in 1990. Griffin appeared in the original Toronto production of John Murrell's Waiting for the Parade. She also played Jessica in the original Montreal production of David French's Jitters.

Biography 
Apart from being a veteran of the stage, her voice over work includes Nelvana's Star Wars: Ewoks, and playing Harmony Bear in 1986's Care Bears Movie II: A New Generation. She voiced Funshine Bear in the Nelvana version of Care Bears, and also voiced Mrs. Suey-Ellen Pig in The Raccoons episodes "Mom's the Word!" and "Promises Promises!". Nonnie's voice appears in Wild Life, a film that was nominated for Best Animated Short at the 2012 Academy Awards.

She made guest appearances on several television series, including Kung Fu: The Legend Continues, King of Kensington, RoboCop: The Series, Forever Knight, Street Legal, Doc, Bizarre and Strange Paradise. Nonnie was a favourite on the children's television series, Polka Dot Door. She played Diana Barry in the first televised production of Anne of Green Gables in 1956.

She also appeared in several films, including The Believers, The Abduction, Good Fences, A Husband, a Wife and a Lover and If You Could See What I Hear.

Nonnie wrote the play Sister Annunciata’s Secret, in which she played six different characters. The play appeared at the 2012 Edinburgh Fringe Festival and later at the Hamilton Fringe Festival.

Nonnie's one woman play, Marilyn-After, which imagines Marilyn Monroe coming back to life fifty years after her untimely death, played the SpringWorks Festival in Stratford, Ontario in 2014. The show also played at Toronto's Buddies In Bad Times Theatre in 2014 and was performed in Hamilton, Ontario in January 2015. Nonnie continued to tour the show throughout 2015 with Baby Gumm Productions, winning Best International Show at the 2015 United Solo Theatre Festival in New York City.

Nonnie's diary, published as Showbiz and other Addictions, follows her career on stages across Canada.

Death 
Griffin, 85, died from a ruptured aortic aneurysm. She was in rehearsals for a new solo show about Margaret Mitchell that would have been performed within days of her death.

References

Nonnie Griffin Biography by L. Mangue, Nerf-Herders Anonymous.net .

External links

1933 births
2019 deaths
Actresses from Toronto
Canadian film actresses
Canadian stage actresses
Canadian television actresses
Canadian voice actresses
Place of death missing